Hadronyche modesta, the Victorian funnel-web spider, is a species of spider found in Victoria, Australia.

Taxonomy
A member of the genus Hadronyche, the Victorian funnel-web spider was first described in 1891 by Simon in the genus Atrax, having been collected from the vicinity of Melbourne. The type specimen is located in Paris.

Description
A small species compared with other Australian funnel-web spiders, the Victorian funnel-web spider has a similar coloration to most other Australian funnel-web spiders, namely a shiny black carapace and black to dark brown legs and chelicerae, with a matt abdomen with a maroon tinge.

Distribution and habitat
The Victorian funnel-web spider is found in southeastern Australia from the vicinity of Melbourne east through the Dandenong Ranges and East Gippsland.

Bites
Although this species is related to the Sydney funnel-web spider, it has not been implicated in any fatalities or serious envenomations. It is only known to cause general symptoms, such as headaches and nausea.

References

External links

Atracidae
Spiders of Australia
Spiders described in 1891
Taxa named by Eugène Simon